Sir Foster Gotch Robinson (19 September 1880 – 31 October 1967) was an English first-class cricketer, horse owner and businessman.

Robinson was born in Sneyd Park, Bristol, the son of Edward Robinson and grandson of Elisha Smith Robinson. He was educated at Clifton College, Bristol and at Exeter College, Oxford. He was Captain of Gloucestershire cricket team, 1919–1923.

He was President of The Grateful Society in 1940, Master of Clifton Rugby Football Club 1943–1944, Master of The Society of Merchant Venturers, 1943–1945, and Chairman of E. S. & A. Robinson, a printing company.

He was knighted at Buckingham Palace on 15 July 1958 by Prince Philip, Duke of Edinburgh.

He was the owner and breeder of Homeward Bound, who won the 1964 Oaks; Huguenot, winner of 19 races; and Merchant Venturer, second to Relko in the 1963 Derby.

Sir Foster died in Eastwood Manor,  East Harptree, Somerset.

References

External links 
  The Robinsons of Bristol 1844-1944

1880 births
1967 deaths
Cricketers from Bristol
People educated at Clifton College
Alumni of Exeter College, Oxford
English cricketers
Gloucestershire cricketers
London County cricketers
Knights Bachelor
Members of the Society of Merchant Venturers